Pietro Gallinari, also known as Pierino del Signor Guido, (1600s–1640) was an Italian painter of the Baroque period. He was a close follower of Guido Reni in Bologna. he painted for the churches and court of Guastalla. He died young, perhaps of poisoning.

References 

17th-century Italian painters
Italian male painters
Painters from Bologna
Italian Baroque painters
1640 deaths
Year of birth unknown